Aggtelek National Park is a national park in Northern Hungary, in the Aggtelek Karst region. The most significant values of the national park are the special surface formations and caves in this limestone landscape.

Description
The park consists of 280 caves with different sizes. It covers a total area of 198.92 km2 of which 39.22 km2 are under increased protection. The largest stalactite cave of Europe is situated in this area: the Baradla cave (26 km long, of which 8 km is in Slovakia, known under the name of Domica).  Several of the caves have different specialities. For example, the Peace Cave has a sanatorium which help treating people suffering from asthma.

History
The first written documentation of the caves can be dated back to 1549. Since 1920 it has been used as a tourist attraction. The Aggtelek National Park itself was founded in 1985. It has been part of the UNESCO World Heritage since 1995 along with the Slovak Karst caves.

Fauna
Animals present in the Aggtelek National Park included the fire salamander, hucul pony, common buzzard, eastern imperial eagle, European copper skink, white-throated dipper, red deer, Eurasian lynx, gray wolf, wild boar, crested tit, goldcrest, Eurasian bullfinch, hazel grouse, common kingfisher, red-backed shrike, old World swallowtail, scarce swallowtail and the saga pedo.

Gallery

References

See also 
 Caves of Aggtelek Karst and Slovak Karst UNESCO World Heritage Site
 List of national parks of Hungary

National parks of Hungary
Biosphere reserves of Hungary
Geography of Borsod-Abaúj-Zemplén County
Protected areas of the Western Carpathians
Tourist attractions in Borsod-Abaúj-Zemplén County
World Heritage Sites in Hungary
1985 establishments in Hungary
Protected areas established in 1985